Afriqiyah Airways Flight 209 was a domestic passenger flight from Sabha to Tripoli, Libya that was hijacked on 23 December 2016 and made a forced landing in Luqa, Malta. The flight was operated by Afriqiyah Airways, Libya's state airline, and carried 111 passengers: 82 males, 28 females and one infant. The two hijackers later released all of the hostages and surrendered to the authorities.

Aircraft
The aircraft involved was an Airbus A320-214, registration 5A-ONB, msn 3236. It had first flown on 29 August 2007.

Hijacking
The aircraft, carrying seven crew and 111 passengers, had taken off from Sabha International Airport at 08:10 local time and was due to land at Tripoli at 09:20. The two hijackers threatened to blow up the aircraft with hand grenades, according to Malta state television. One hijacker declared himself to be "pro-Gaddafi" and that he would release all passengers, but not the crew, if his unknown demands were accepted. The pilots had tried to land in Libya, but the hijackers refused their request. The aircraft was forced to land at Malta International Airport at 11:32 am local time. The aircraft's engines were still running after it was surrounded by the Maltese military. One hijacker was reported to have appeared at the aircraft door waving a large green flag similar to the Libyan flag under Gaddafi. He then put the flag down and returned inside.

Response
Negotiating teams were placed on standby and Maltese military units arrived at the airport. Upon landing, at least 25 passengers had been released by the two hijackers, and negotiations were held. Following the release of all passengers and crew, the hijackers, Suhah Mussa and Ahmed Ali, surrendered to the Maltese authorities and were taken into custody. It was subsequently revealed that the weapons they had brandished were replicas.

Aftermath 
On 2 December 2020, Suhah Mussa was sentenced to 25 years' imprisonment and fined €9,990 after he pleaded guilty to the charges against him.

Film

On the day of the hijacking, the Malta airport was being used to film scenes for the movie Entebbe about the 1976 hijacking of Air France Flight 139 and Operation Entebbe, which had resulted in the release of most of the passengers and the deaths of the hostage-takers. Scenes of the real-life hostages exiting the Afriqiyah plane were filmed, edited and inserted in the movie, and producer Melvin Rotherberg qualified the event as a "blessing from the sky on a day of bad acting." Some of the passengers were subsequently cast as extras in the movie.

See also
 List of aircraft hijackings
 EgyptAir Flight 181

References

External links
 News story about the hijacking (in Maltese). Archived

2016 in Libya
2016 in Malta
Aircraft hijackings
Aviation accidents and incidents in 2016
Accidents and incidents involving the Airbus A320
Aviation accidents and incidents in Libya
Aviation accidents and incidents in Malta
209
Luqa
December 2016 crimes in Africa
December 2016 crimes in Europe
Second Libyan Civil War